is a former Japanese rugby union player who played as a prop. He spent his whole career playing for Coca-Cola Red Sparks in Japan's domestic Top League, playing over 50 times. He was named in the Japan squad for the 2007 Rugby World Cup, making 3 appearances in the tournament. He made a further 14 appearances for Japan in his career, scoring one try against Italy.

References

External links
itsrugby.co.uk profile

1976 births
Living people
Japanese rugby union players
Rugby union props
Coca-Cola Red Sparks players